Alexander Evelyn Michael Waugh (born 1963) is an English writer, critic, and journalist. Among other books, he has written Fathers and Sons: The Autobiography of a Family (2004), about five generations of his own family, and The House of Wittgenstein: A Family at War (2008) about the Wittgenstein family. He is an advocate of the Oxfordian theory, which holds that Edward de Vere, 17th Earl of Oxford was the real author of the works of William Shakespeare.

Life
Alexander is the eldest son of Auberon and Lady Teresa Waugh, and the brother of Daisy Waugh and the grandson of Evelyn Waugh. He was educated at Taunton School, the University of Manchester and the University of Surrey, where he gained degrees in Music. Alexander Waugh was the chief opera critic of The Mail on Sunday (1990–91) and of the Evening Standard (1991–1996). His books on music include Classical Music: A New Way of Listening  (1995) and Opera: A New Way of Listening (1996).

Waugh's biography Fathers and Sons: The Autobiography of a Family (2004), written at the suggestion of Sir Vidia Naipaul after his father died, is a portrait of the male relations across five generations in his own family. Described as "breezily irreverent" by John Banville in The New York Review of Books, it formed the basis of a BBC Four television documentary, presented by the author, which was broadcast in 2006. He is the general editor of The Complete Works of Evelyn Waugh (43 volumes planned), a project which began in 2009 with the first four volumes appearing in 2017 published by the Oxford University Press. 

Waugh's biography of the Wittgenstein family (The House of Wittgenstein: A Family at War) was published in 2008. Terry Eagleton in a review for The Guardian found it an "eminently readable, meticulously researched account of the Wittgenstein madhouse". Although he thought Waugh wrote less about Ludwig Wittgenstein than he would desire, he "certainly casts some light" on the philosopher's "extraordinary contradictions." Philosopher Ray Monk in his review for Standpoint magazine commented that Waugh, in his account of a substantial portion of the Wittgenstein family fortune ending up with the Nazis, uses "much hitherto unknown documentation" and "Waugh's version is more authoritative and fuller than previous accounts." Monk writes that concert pianist Paul Wittgenstein gains the largest share of the text and much of the book is written from his viewpoint.

His other books include Time: From Microseconds to Millennia; A Search for the Right Time (1999) and God (2002). In Evelyn Waugh: Fictions, Faith and Family, Michael G. Brennan described Time as being "one of the most intriguing books produced by" any of his later family. "Ranging through religious, classical and renaissance scholarship, it blends past beliefs and theories, often in gently subversive ways, with more recent scientific thought."

Oxfordian theory and Shakespeare
Waugh is an advocate of the Oxfordian theory, which contends that Edward de Vere, 17th Earl of Oxford, wrote the works of William Shakespeare. He discovered what he claims to be surreptitious allusions embedded in 16th- and 17th-century works revealing that the name William Shakespeare was a pseudonym used by Oxford to write the Shakespeare oeuvre. Of one example which gained coverage in October 2013, Shakespearean scholar Professor Stanley Wells told The Sunday Times: "I’m mystified that an intelligent person like Alexander Waugh can see any significance in this kind of juggling with letters."

Waugh's book, Shakespeare in Court (2014) takes the form of a fictional trial which draws the conclusion that Shakespeare was a front for others but, on this occasion, does not propose another candidate.

He was elected chairman of the De Vere Society in spring 2016 for a three-year term.

In late October 2017, The Guardian reported that Waugh believes the title and dedication of the William Aspley edition of Shakespeare's sonnets of 1609 hold encrypted evidence of the final resting place of the author: de Vere's grave in Westminster Abbey's Poets' Corner.

Personal life
Waugh met his wife, Eliza, while they were both students at Manchester University. Eliza is the daughter of the journalist Alexander Chancellor. The couple have three children.

Bibliography

Books
 
 U.S. publication: 
 Opera: A New Way of Listening (De Agostini, 1996)
 Time: From Microseconds to Millennia; A Search for the Right Time (Headline 1999; Carroll and Graf 2000)
 God (Headline 2002; St Martin’s Press 2004)
 Fathers and Sons: The Autobiography of a Family (Headline 2004: Nan Talese 2007)
 The House of Wittgenstein: A Family at War (Doubleday, 2009)

Critical studies and reviews of Waugh's work
Fathers and sons

References

External links
 "Waugh on Jonson’s 'Sweet Swan of Avon'", The Oxfordian 16 (2014): 97–103.
  The Daily Telegraph, 17 July 1998, "Light Reading on the 6.15: Alexander Waugh tells Eliza Charlton about his publishing brainwave – the short story that folds like a map"
 "Waugh Stories" The New Yorker review of Fathers and Sons, by Joan Acocella 

1963 births
Living people
Alumni of the University of Manchester
Alumni of the University of Surrey
English music critics
English writers
Opera critics
Alexander
People educated at Taunton School
Oxfordian theory of Shakespeare authorship
Shakespeare authorship theorists
Onslow family